Steven or Stephen Royce may refer to:

Stephen Royce, US politician
Steven Royce House
Steven Royce, character in Suburgatory